The 2004–05 Welsh League Cup season was won by Carmarthen Town, beating Rhyl FC in the final. It was the first victory for Carmarthen Town in the competition, and the third appearance by Rhyl FC in the final. The final took place at Latham Park, in Newtown, Wales. The match was refereed by N L Morgan.

Round and draw dates
Source

Knockout stage
Sources

Preliminary round

|}

First round

|}

Second round

|}

Semi-finals

|}

Final

See also
 Welsh League Cup
 Welsh Premier League
 Welsh Cup

References

External links
Official League Cup Website
 Welsh-Premier.com Loosemores League Cup
Loosemores Solicitors Official Website

Welsh League Cup seasons
League Cup